Alejandro Saúl Chumacero Bracamonte (born 22 April 1991) is a Bolivian international footballer who plays for Wilstermann and the Bolivia national team as a midfielder.

Club career
Born in La Paz, Chumacero has played for The Strongest and Sport Recife.

He signed a five-year contract with Brazilian club Sport Recife in July 2013. In December 2013 he said he wished to leave the club and return to former club The Strongest due to lack of first-team games.

In December 2017 it was announced he would sign for Liga MX with club Puebla.

International career
He made his international debut for Bolivia in 2011, and has appeared in FIFA World Cup qualifying matches for them.

He represented Bolivia at the 2015 Copa América and was critical of the Bolivian press coverage of the team's performance in the tournament, believing them to be unfairly negative.

International goals
Scores and results list Bolivia's goal tally first.

References

1991 births
Living people
Footballers from La Paz
Bolivian footballers
Bolivia international footballers
The Strongest players
Sport Club do Recife players
Club Puebla players
Unión Española footballers
Campeonato Brasileiro Série B players
Liga MX players
Chilean Primera División players
Association football midfielders
Bolivian expatriate footballers
Bolivian expatriate sportspeople in Brazil
Expatriate footballers in Brazil
Bolivian expatriate sportspeople in Mexico
Expatriate footballers in Mexico
Bolivian expatriate sportspeople in Chile
Expatriate footballers in Chile
2015 Copa América players
2019 Copa América players